Guy Niv (born 8 March 1994 in Misgav) is an Israeli former cyclist, who competed as a professional for UCI WorldTeam  from 2018 to 2022. In 2019, he completed the Giro d'Italia, finishing in 113th place. In August  2020, he became the first Israeli national to race in the Tour de France.

In September 2022, he announced his retirement from the sport, citing a loss of motivation and desire to compete.

Major results
2019
 National Road Championships
1st  Time trial
3rd Road race
 6th Overall Tour de Taiwan
 7th Overall GP Beiras e Serra da Estrela
2020
 2nd Time trial, National Road Championships
2021
 1st Stage 1b (TTT) Settimana Internazionale di Coppi e Bartali

Grand Tour general classification results timeline

References

External links

1994 births
Living people
Israeli male cyclists
People from Northern District (Israel)